Colonel Guillermo Flores Avendaño (17 June 1894 – 26 May 1982) was President of Guatemala from 27 October 1957 until 2 March 1958, when he was appointed Minister of Defence in the government of Miguel Ydígoras.

References

1894 births
1982 deaths
Presidents of Guatemala
Vice presidents of Guatemala
Guatemalan generals
Government ministers of Guatemala
People from Guatemala City